The All India Services Act, 1951 is an Indian legislation. The Act established two All India Services and provides for the creation of three more.

History
During the occupation of India by the East India Company, the civil services were divided into three — covenanted, uncovenanted and special civil services. The covenanted civil service, or the Honourable East India Company's Civil Service (HEICCS), as it was called, largely consisted of British civil servants occupying the senior posts in the government. The uncovenanted civil service was solely introduced to facilitate the entry of Indians into the lower rung of the administration. The special service consisted of specialised departments, such as the Indian Forest Service, Indian Police and Indian Political Service, whose ranks were drawn from either the covenanted civil services or the British Indian Army. The Indian Police ranked many British Indian Army officers among its members, although after 1893, an annual exam was used to select its officers. In 1858, the HEICCS was replaced by the Indian Civil Service (ICS), which became the highest civil service in British-ruled India between 1858 and 1947. The last British appointments to the ICS were made in 1942.

With the passing of the Government of India Act, 1919, the Imperial Services — under the oversight of the Secretary of State for India — were split into two arms, the All India Services and the Central Services. The Imperial Civil Service was one of the ten All India Services.

In 1946, at the Premier's Conference, the then-Central Cabinet decided to form the Indian Administrative Service (IAS), based on the Imperial Civil Service (ICS); and the Indian Police Service (IPS), based on the Imperial Police (IP).When India was partitioned following the departure of the British in 1947, the Imperial Civil Service was divided between the new dominions of India and Pakistan. The Indian remnant of the ICS was named the Indian Administrative Service, while the Pakistan remnant was named the Pakistan Administrative Service (PAS). The modern Indian Administrative Service and Indian Police Service were created under the Article 312(2) in part XIV of the Constitution of India, and the All India Services Act, 1951.

Provisions 
The Act creates two All India Services as per the article 312(2) in part XIV of the Constitution of India, namely, the Indian Administrative Service (IAS) and the Indian Police Service (IPS).

The act — subject to a two-thirds majority (supermajority) in the Rajya Sabha — also provides for the creation of three more All India Services, namely, the Indian Engineering Service, the Indian Forest Service, and Indian Medical and Health Service. Of these, only the Indian Forest Service was created under the All India Services Act, 1951 in 1966.

Amendments
The All India Services Act, 1951 has been amended four times.

References

Bibliography

Books

Paper

 

All India Services
1951 in India
Nehru administration
Acts of the Parliament of India 1951